Nemertodermatida is a class of Acoelomorpha, comprising 18 species of millimetre-sized turbellariform, mostly interstitial worms.

Taxonomy
The order Nemertodermatida contains two families with 6 genera. The high level of cryptic diversity in this meiofauna group however implies that the number of nemertodermatid taxa may be underestimated.

Ascopariidae
The family Ascopariidae Sterrer, 1998 contains two genera.
 Ascoparia Sterrer, 1998
 Flagellophora Faubel & Dorjes, 1978

There are 3 species in the family Ascopariidae.

Nemertodermatidae
The family Nemertodermatidae Steinböck, 1930 contains four genera.
 Meara
 Nemertinoides
 Nemertoderma
 Sterreria

There are 15 species in the family Nemertodermatidae.

Notes

References 

Acoelomorphs
Animal classes